William Charles Cameron (5 August 1928 – 22 April 2021) was an Australian rules footballer who played with St Kilda in the Victorian Football League (VFL).

Notes

External links 
		

1928 births
Australian rules footballers from Victoria (Australia)
St Kilda Football Club players
Maffra Football Club players
2021 deaths